Xeb Powell (born on January 18, 2000) is an American professional snowboarder based out of North Carolina. Xeb Powell is best known for his unforgivingly aggressive style that has won him gold in the 2020 XGames Knuckle Huck. Being the first black snowboarder to win gold in XGames history Zeb takes it upon himself to push for more diversity in the sport by partnering with Hoods to Woods an organization aiming to help the melanated youth have a chance to have a place in snowboarding.

Early life 
Zeb Powell was born in North Carolina, and raised by adopted parents Carl Powell and Valerie Powell. His Father Carl Powell runs a chip mill and his mother Valerie Powell is an assistant teacher. He also has grown up with the same group of friends since elementary school; Alex Jack, Andrew, Luke, and Siler just to name a few. Zeb did not enjoy snowboarding at a young age due to an instructor forcing him to ride in regular stance, opposed to goofy. This did not stop Zeb as he quickly mastered his skills and won his first competition, Red Bull All Snow, at the age of 15.

On the Mountain 
X Games 2020 Knuckle Huck - Zeb Powell placed 1st

X Games 2022 Knuckle Huck - Zeb Powell placed 4th

Red Bull All Snow 2016 at Carinthia Parks - Zeb Powell Place 1st

Off the Mountain 
Hoods to Woods Foundation - Zeb Powell Partners up with Hoods to Woods to help bring more diversity to skiing and snowboarding while bringing new opportunities to people of color.

References 

American male snowboarders

2001 births

Living people

Wikipedia Student Program